= John G. Proakis =

American engineer

- Born: United States
- Died: United States
- Occupations: Engineer and scientist

John G. Proakis (born June 10, 1935) is an American scientist and engineer. He is described as an expert in adaptive filtering, adaptive communication systems and adaptive equalization techniques, communication through fading multipath channels, radar detection, signal parameter estimation, optimization techniques, and statistical analysis.

== Education ==
He received his B.S.E.E. degree from the University of Cincinnati, Cincinnati, Ohio, United States, in 1959. He received his M.S.E.E. degree from the Massachusetts Institute of Technology, Cambridge, Massachusetts, United States, in 1961. He completed his Ph.D. at Harvard University, Cambridge, Massachusetts, United States, in 1967.

== Career ==
He was a faculty member at Northeastern University from 1969 through 1998, and is now a professor emeritus. He is also an adjunct professor at the University of California, San Diego.

== Awards and honors ==
He is a winner of the IEEE James H. Mulligan Jr. Education Medal.

He is an IEEE Life Fellow and recipient of the IEEE Signal Processing Society Education Award in 2004.

== Bibliography ==
He is the author of a number of notable books on digital communication.

== See also ==
- Institute of Electrical and Electronics Engineers
- Northeastern University
